Steve Thomas is an English rugby union and rugby league footballer who played  for Bradford Bulls and London Broncos. He is a Wales international.
Steve Thomas played rugby union for Gloucester, and made over 100 appearances for Neath winning 5 Principality Premiership titles, 2 Konika Minolta cups and represented Wales vs Papua New Guinea. In the process, he held the record for tries in a season with 30 - 22 league and 8 cup. He scored vs Romania in Rugby World Cup warm up.

Background
Steve Thomas was born in Truro, Cornwall, England.

International honours
Steve Thomas won caps for Wales while at Bradford Bulls, London Broncos scoring on his début vs Ireland aged just 19 at Swansea City's Vetch Field. Between 1999 and 2007 he appeared 5 times for Wales (including one as substitute), scoring 2 tries and 8 points.

Before moving to professional rugby league at 16, Thomas won junior international rugby union honours for Wales U19 vs Canada and Portugal. He scored 2 tries for Wales RL U19 vs England at Centre, and represented Great Britain Academy vs France later the same year.

References

1979 births
Living people
Bradford Bulls players
English people of Welsh descent
English rugby league players
English rugby union players
Gloucester Rugby players
Leeds Rhinos players
London Broncos players
Neath RFC players
Rugby league players from Cornwall
Rugby union players from Truro
Wales national rugby league team players
Warrington Wolves players
Rugby articles needing expert attention